The 1830 Illinois gubernatorial election was the fourth quadrennial election for this office.  State Representative John Reynolds was elected comfortably, defeating Lt. Governor William Kinney.

Results

References
Illinois Blue Book 1899

Illinois
1830
Gubernatorial